Sternotomis amabilis is a species of beetle in the family Cerambycidae. It was described by Frederick William Hope in 1843.

References

Sternotomini
Beetles described in 1843